Mittleres Nordfriesland is an Amt ("collective municipality") in the district of Nordfriesland, in Schleswig-Holstein, Germany. Its seat is in Bredstedt. It was formed on 1 April 2008 from the former Ämter Bredstedt-Land and Stollberg, and the town Bredstedt.

The Amt Mittleres Nordfriesland consists of the following municipalities:

Ahrenshöft
Almdorf
Bargum
Bohmstedt
Bordelum
Bredstedt
Breklum
Drelsdorf
Goldebek
Goldelund
Högel
Joldelund
Kolkerheide
Langenhorn
Lütjenholm
Ockholm
Sönnebüll
Struckum
Vollstedt

References

Ämter in Schleswig-Holstein